Conclusion may refer to:

Media
Conclusion (music), the ending of a composition
Conclusion (album), an album by Conflict
The Conclusion (album), an album by Bombshell Rocks
Baahubali 2: The Conclusion, 2017 Indian film
"Conclusion", a song from Wu Tang Clan's Enter the Wu-Tang (36 Chambers)

Law
Conclusion of law, a question which must be answered by applying relevant legal principles
Conclusion of fact, a question which must be answered by reference to facts and evidence

Logic
Consequent, the second half of a hypothetical proposition
Logical consequence (or entailment), the relationship between statements that holds true when one logically "follows from" one or more others
Result (or upshot), the final consequence of a sequence of actions or events
Affirmative conclusion from a negative premise, a logical fallacy

Other uses
Conclusion (book), the concluding section of a book
Conclusion of Utrecht, a synod of the Christian Reformed Church
Statistical conclusion validity, a statistical test
Sudler's Conclusion, a historic home in Puerto Rico, Somerset County, Maryland

See also
 Closing (disambiguation)
 End (disambiguation)
 Final (disambiguation)